A gongpit was the pit of a gong, an early English word for a place to urinate and defecate.

It may refer to:

 cesspit
 outhouse
 pit toilet
 latrine